The 2017 CS Warsaw Cup was a senior international figure skating competition, held in November 2017 in Warsaw, Poland. It was part of the 2017–18 ISU Challenger Series. Medals were awarded in the disciplines of men's singles, ladies' singles, pair skating, and ice dance.

Entries 
The International Skating Union published the full preliminary list of entries on 23 October 2017.

 Withdrew before starting orders were drawn
 Ladies: Loena Hendrickx (BEL) - Roberta Rodeghiero (ITA) - Julie Froetscher (FRA) - Lutricia Bock (GER)
 Men: Elladj Balde (CAN) - Franz Streubel (GER)
 Ice Dance: Adelina Galayavieva / Laurent Abecassis (FRA) - Jasmine Tessari / Francesco Fioretti (ITA) - Sara Hurtado / Kirill Khaliavin (ESP)

Results

Men

Ladies

Pairs

Ice dance

References

Citations

External links 
 2017 CS Warsaw Cup at the International Skating Union

Warsaw Cup
CS Warsaw Cup
2017 in Polish sport